József Munk (30 November 1890, Budapest, Kingdom of Hungary – after 1942) was a Hungarian freestyle swimmer who competed at the 1908 Summer Olympics. He was Jewish, and in 1942 he fell into the hands of the Soviets. He was taken as a prisoner to the Soviet Union, from where he never returned.

At the 1908 Olympics he won a silver medal as a member of a Hungarian 4x200 metre freestyle relay team. He also competed in the 100 metre freestyle, but placed fourth in his heat and did not advance.

See also
 List of select Jewish swimmers

References

External links
 
 
 

1890 births
Year of death missing
Swimmers from Budapest
Hungarian Jews
Jewish swimmers
Hungarian male swimmers
Olympic swimmers of Hungary
Swimmers at the 1908 Summer Olympics
Olympic silver medalists for Hungary
Hungarian male freestyle swimmers
Medalists at the 1908 Summer Olympics
Olympic silver medalists in swimming